Zaplous annulatus is a species of beetle in the family Cerambycidae. It was described by Louis Alexandre Auguste Chevrolat in 1862, originally under the genus Ecyrus. It is known from Cuba and the United States.

References

Pogonocherini
Beetles described in 1862